This article presents a list of the historical events and publications of Australian literature during 1935.

Books 
 Winifred Birkett – Earth's Quality
 Martin Boyd – The Lemon Farm
 Jean Devanny
 The Ghost Wife
 The Virtuous Courtesan
 Arthur Gask – The Hangman's Knot
 Jack Lindsay – Last Days with Cleopatra
 Jack McLaren – The Devil of the Depths
 T. Inglis Moore – The Half-Way Sun : A Tale of the Philippine Islands
 Ambrose Pratt – Lift Up your Eyes
 Alice Grant Rosman – The Sleeping Child
 Kylie Tennant – Tiburon
 E. V. Timms – Far Caravan

Children's 
 Mary Grant Bruce – Wings Above the Billabong
 Jack Lindsay – Runaway
 P. L. Travers – Mary Poppins Comes Back
 Dorothy Wall – Brownie: The Story of a Naughty Little Rabbit

Poetry 

 C. J. Dennis
 The Singing Garden
 "Unconsidered Trifles"
 Mary Gilmore – "The Wanderer"
 Patrick White – The Ploughman and Other Poems
 Douglas Stewart – "Mending the Bridge"

Drama 
 Dymphna Cusack
 Anniversary
 Red Sky at Morning
 Dulcie Deamer – Revaluation
 Katharine Susannah Prichard – Forward One

Awards and honours

Literary

Births 

A list, ordered by date of birth (and, if the date is either unspecified or repeated, ordered alphabetically by surname) of births in 1935 of Australian literary figures, authors of written works or literature-related individuals follows, including year of death.

 21 March – Thomas Shapcott, novelist and poet
 7 October – Thomas Keneally, novelist
 18 November – Rodney Hall, novelist
 27 November – Marshall Browne, novelist (died 2014)
 28 November – Randolph Stow, novelist (died 2010)

Deaths 

A list, ordered by date of death (and, if the date is either unspecified or repeated, ordered alphabetically by surname) of deaths in 1935 of Australian literary figures, authors of written works or literature-related individuals follows, including year of birth.

 22 February – Frederick Manning, novelist and poet (born 1882)
 18 March – Mabel Forrest, poet and short story writer (born 1872)
 10 April – Rosa Praed, novelist (born 1851)
 6 September — John Bede Dalley, journalist and novelist (born 1876)
 23 September – Louis Stone, novelist (born 1871)
 11 October – Steele Rudd, short story writer (born 1868)
 23 November – Louise Mack, novelist and poet (born 1870)

See also 
 1935 in poetry
 List of years in literature
 List of years in Australian literature
 1935 in literature
 1934 in Australian literature
 1935 in Australia
 1936 in Australian literature

References

Literature
Australian literature by year
20th-century Australian literature